This is a list of films produced in China ordered by year of release in the 2000s. For an alphabetical listing of Chinese films see :Category:Chinese films

2000
 List of Chinese films of 2000

2001
 List of Chinese films of 2001

2002
 List of Chinese films of 2002

2003
 List of Chinese films of 2003

2004
 List of Chinese films of 2004

2005
 List of Chinese films of 2005

2006
 List of Chinese films of 2006

2007
 List of Chinese films of 2007

2008
 List of Chinese films of 2008

2009
 List of Chinese films of 2009

See also
 
Cinema of China
Best 100 Chinese Motion Pictures as chosen by the 24th Hong Kong Film Awards

External links
IMDb list of Chinese films

Films
Chinese

zh:中国大陆电影